In enzymology, a 2-hydroxymuconate-semialdehyde hydrolase is an enzyme that catalyzes the chemical reaction

2-hydroxymuconate semialdehyde + H2O  formate + 2-oxopent-4-enoate

Thus, the two substrates of this enzyme are 2-hydroxymuconate semialdehyde and H2O, whereas its two products are formate and 2-oxopent-4-enoate.

This enzyme belongs to the family of hydrolases, specifically those acting on carbon-carbon bonds in ketonic substances.  The systematic name of this enzyme class is 2-hydroxymuconate-semialdehyde formylhydrolase. Other names in common use include 2-hydroxy-6-oxohepta-2,4-dienoate hydrolase, 2-hydroxymuconic semialdehyde hydrolase, HMSH, and HOD hydrolase.  This enzyme participates in 5 metabolic pathways: benzoate degradation via hydroxylation, toluene and xylene degradation, 1,4-dichlorobenzene degradation, carbazole degradation, and styrene degradation.

Structural studies

References

 
 

EC 3.7.1
Enzymes of known structure